Lo bah png, as known as minced pork rice, is a rice dish that is commonly seen throughout Taiwan and Southern Fujian. The flavor may vary from one region to another, but the basic ingredients remain the same: ground pork marinated and boiled in soy sauce served on top of steamed rice. It is a type of gaifan dish.

Etymology 
According to Shuowen Jiezi (說文解字, Explaining Simple and Analyzing Compound Characters), the word "Lu (滷)" has the closest meaning to "cooking in thick broth or sauce." This gives the term "滷肉飯" the direct meaning of "rice with braised meat."

However, for several decades, many Taiwanese people have used the homophone "魯" instead of "滷". Although people still use the original character in China, "魯肉飯" has become the most common name seen in Taiwanese restaurants and street vendors. 魯 is the ancient name for the Chinese province of Shandong, which led the Michelin Green Guide Taiwan to write in April 2011 that minced pork rice originated from Shandong. This confusion then led to a fierce debate in which most Taiwanese insisted that minced pork rice was in reality a true symbol of Taiwan, while others viewed it as a Chinese dish that caught on in Taiwan.

Preparation 
As the origin of the flavor, the sauce is the key to making minced pork rice. The most popular way of preparation seen in Taiwan is stir-frying the ground meat with sliced shallot in oil, and then boiling it in soy sauce. In the frying process, one may customize the flavor by adding seasonings such as sugar, rice wine, pepper and other spices. 
When finished, the dark-brown meat sauce is called "bah-sò (肉燥)", and is also served with noodles, soup, vegetables and many homemade Taiwanese dishes.

Regional varieties 
While minced pork rice is an important icon in typical Taiwanese folk cuisine, the variety of methods to customize flavors is so wide that it creates considerable differences between regions. In southern Taiwan, where people name it by the sauce "bah-sò-pn̄g (肉燥飯)" instead of the meat, minced pork rice is preferably served with pork with less fat. People in the north of Taiwan favor a greasier version of meat sauce with rice, sometimes even with glutinous rice mixed in.

In southern Taiwan, while "bah-sò-pn̄g" is seen on the menu indicating minced pork rice, "ló͘-bah-pn̄g (滷肉飯)" remains on the very same menu, referring to another dish where braised pork belly covers the rice. The same rice with braised pork belly is known as "khòng-bah-pn̄g (焢肉飯)" in northern Taiwan.

See also

 Taiwanese cuisine
 Khong bah png (braised pork rice)
 List of pork dishes

References

Chinese rice dishes
Taiwanese rice dishes
Ground meat
National dishes
Chinese pork dishes
Taiwanese pork dishes